Hamilton Crescent is a cricket ground in the Partick area of Glasgow, Scotland, which is the home of the West of Scotland Cricket Club.

Hamilton Crescent hosted the first international football match, between Scotland and England, played on 30 November 1872, which ended in a goalless draw, and was watched by a crowd of 4,000. A plaque on the wall of the clubhouse was placed to commemorate the match in 2002 by Mr John C McGinn, President of the Scottish Football Association.

Further international matches were held here in 1874 and 1876, before being moved to the first Hampden Park. The 1877 Scottish Cup Final was also held at Hamilton Crescent, as was a rugby union international when Scotland and Wales drew their match in the 1885 Home Nations Championship.

The gates are typically closed to visitors.

References

Cricket grounds in Scotland
Sports venues in Glasgow
Defunct football venues in Scotland
Scotland national football team venues
Partick